Psi  (uppercase , lowercase  or ;  psi ) is the 23rd letter of the Greek alphabet and is associated with a numeric value of 700. In both Classical and Modern Greek, the letter indicates the combination  (as in English word "lapse").

For Greek loanwords in Latin and modern languages with Latin alphabets, psi is usually transliterated as "ps".

The letter's origin is uncertain. It may or may not derive from the Phoenician alphabet. There are several psi-like symbols such as 𐀂 (*28), 𐀚(*24) and 𐀩(*27) in the Linear B script, which suggests a pre-Phoenician origin of the character. It appears in the 7th century BC, expressing  in the Eastern alphabets, but  in the Western alphabets (the sound expressed by Χ in the Eastern alphabets). In writing, the early letter appears in an angular shape.
There were early graphical variants that omitted the stem ("chickenfoot-shaped psi" as:  or ).

The Western letter (expressing , later ) was adopted into the Old Italic alphabets, and its shape is also continued into the Algiz rune of the Elder Futhark. 

However, it was abandoned after his death.

The classical Greek letter was adopted into the early Cyrillic alphabet as "Ѱ".

Use as a symbol
The letter psi is commonly used in physics to represent wave functions in quantum mechanics, such as in the Schrödinger equation and bra–ket notation: .  It is also used to represent the (generalized) positional states of a qubit in a quantum computer.

Psi is also used as the symbol for the polygamma function, defined by

where  is the gamma function.

The letters Ψ or ψ can also be a symbol for:
Psychology, psychiatry, and sometimes parapsychology (involving paranormal or relating with the supernatural subjects, especially research into extrasensory perception).
In mathematics, the reciprocal Fibonacci constant, the division polynomials, and the supergolden ratio.
Water potential in movement of water between plant cells.
In biochemistry, it denotes pseudouridine, an uncommon nucleoside.
Stream function in fluid mechanics defining the curve to which the flow velocity is always tangent.
One of the dihedral angles in the backbones of proteins.
The planet Neptune.
Indiana University (as a superimposed I and U). 
A sai, the name of which is pronounced the same way.
Pharmacology, general pharmacy.
In virology the ψ site is a viral packaging signal.
The J/ψ meson, in particle physics.
In the computability theory,  represents the return value  of a program .
In circadian physiology, ψ represents the phase relationship between a zeitgeber and a biological rhythm.
In building, to represent an adjustment to a U-value, accounting for thermal bridge effects.
The ordinal collapsing function and notation developed by Wilfried Buchholz.
In Biblical studies, as an abbreviation for the book of Psalms.

Character encodings

 Greek / Coptic Psi

 Cyrillic Psi

 Mathematical Psi

These characters are used only as mathematical symbols. Stylized Greek text should be encoded using the normal Greek letters, with markup and formatting to indicate text style.

See also

Psi and phi type figurine
Psi (Cyrillic)

Notes and references 

Greek letters